

Pecho Dexter (1963–1984) was an American Quarter Horse. He earned his slot in the American Quarter Horse Hall of Fame by the claiming 13 year-end high point awards in four years, showing in halter, western pleasure, trail horse, and what was then called English Pleasure, but is now Hunter Under Saddle. In all, he earned a total of 1058 points with the American Quarter Horse Association (or AQHA).

Pecho Dexter was a gelding, a son of Poco Pecho, grandson of Hall of Fame member Poco Pine,  and a descendant of Poco Bueno. His dam Miss Hogan was a double descendant of Golden Chief. He also traced to Peter McCue and Joe Hancock P-455.

Pecho Dexter died in 1984 and in 2005 was inducted into the AQHA Hall of Fame. He was the second horse inducted into the National Snaffle Bit Association Hall of Fame.

Notes

References

 All Breed Pedigree Database Pedigree of Pecho Dexter retrieved on June 30, 2007
 American Quarter Horse Foundation – Pecho Dexter accessed on September 1, 2017
 AQHA Hall of Fame accessed on September 1, 2017

Further reading

External links
 Pecho Dexter at Quarter Horse Directory
 Pecho Dexter at Quarter Horse Legends

American Quarter Horse show horses
1963 animal births
1984 animal deaths
AQHA Hall of Fame (horses)